Euptera hirundo is a butterfly in the family Nymphalidae. It is found in Cameroon, Gabon, the Democratic Republic of the Congo, Uganda, Kenya, Zambia and Tanzania. The habitat consists of forests.

Subspecies
Euptera hirundo hirundo (Nigeria, Cameroon, Gabon, Uganda, Democratic Republic of the Congo: north to Ituri, Ulele and Equateur)
Euptera hirundo lufirensis Joicey & Talbot, 1921 (eastern Democratic Republic of the Congo, Uganda, north-western Tanzania, Zambia)

References

Butterflies described in 1891
Euptera
Butterflies of Africa